Greeks in the United Kingdom are British residents and citizens of full or partial Greek heritage, or Greeks who emigrated to and reside in the United Kingdom. They may be from Greece, Cyprus or other countries with Greek minorities.

History

Early Greek contact

Mycenaean Greeks 
The Mycenaean civilization was an early Greek civilization which flourished during the period between 1600 BC, when Helladic culture in mainland Greece was transformed under influences from Minoan Crete, and 1100 BC, when it perished with the collapse of Bronze-Age civilization in the eastern Mediterranean.  Through trading and conquest, Mycenaean civilization spread its influence from Mycenae to many parts of the Mediterranean region and Europe.  Mycenaean bronze double axes and other objects (Rillaton Barrow, Pelynt Dagger) dating from the thirteenth century BC have been found in Ireland and in Wessex and Cornwall in England, proving at least indirect Greek contact with Ireland and Great Britain at the time.

Cassiterides 
Ancient Greek writers, including Herodotus, mention a group of islands which were called Cassiterides. Modern researchers suggest that they may refer to the British Isles.

Aristotle 
Aristotle, in the work On the Universe, mentions the Britannic islands, two islands which were called Albion, which is the modern Great Britain, and Ierne, which is the modern Ireland.

Pytheas 
The first known Greek to come to Britain was Pytheas who lived in late 4th and early 3rd centuries BC. It may have been used by some of the local peoples where Pytheas landed to themselves -Pretani.

Roman period 
Many Greeks later arrived with the Roman legions as soldiers and traders, and their presence is attested by inscriptions on curse tablets, gravestones and dedicatory tablets in both Greek and Latin displayed in the Museum of London and elsewhere, including:

and:

and two dedicatory plaques found in York beneath what is now the railway station. These were erected by a certain Scribonius Demetrius, possibly to be identified with Demetrius of Tarsus, who visited Britain at the time of Gnaeus Julius Agricola:

and

As far north as Cumbria, we find the tomb of Hermes of Commagene:

Indeed, the Roman city of Carlisle, judging by surviving inscriptions, seems to have been home to a thriving Greek community. It is a matter of historical record then, that Greek was being spoken in England hundreds of years before the English language or Anglo-Saxon peoples ever reached its shores.

Middle ages

Early Middle Ages 
In the 7th century, following the death of the previous holder of the post, the Greek Theodore of Tarsus was appointed Archbishop of Canterbury (669 AD); he played an important part in the early history of England, building churches and monasteries and establishing theological studies. According to the Venerable Bede, Theodore contributed to the bringing of a greater unity to English Christianity, and in 672 presided over the first council of the entire English Church, at Hertford. The structure of dioceses and parishes he put in place is still substantially in place today.

Late Middle Ages 
The Byzantine ruler Manuel II visited England in 1400, where he was received by Henry IV at Eltham Palace.

A Greek presence in London was recorded with the two brothers, Andronikos and Alexios Effomatos – described in contemporary records as "Grekes" – who were known to have been resident in London in 1440. They were from Constantinople, the capital of Byzantium.

In 1445, the king of England, Henry VI (1421–1471), granted the brothers permission to remain in London and to practise their trade of gold wire drawing. They made a costly type of thread in which thin strands of gold were intertwined with silk, and which was then used in expensive luxury fabrics and in sacerdotal vestments, a craft for which Constantinople had been famous in its heyday. Thanks to this royal grant, the brothers remained in London for many years. They lived first in the area of Cripplegate, much of which is now covered by the Barbican Centre, and later they moved to Broad Street, in what was then the Italian quarter of London. Andronikos, the elder, died in about 1472, but Alexios was still there in 1484, over forty years after his first arrival.

That set the pattern for Greek settlement over the next two hundred years. Some came as soldiers during the reign of Henry VIII, led by the officers Theodore Luchisi, Antonios Stesinos, and Colonel Thomas of Argos, responsible for the garrisoning of the then-English possession of Calais. Some came as visitors for a short period. In about 1545,  of Corfu spent time in London and left an interesting account of his impressions. Indeed, he followed as a non-combatant an English invasion of Scotland where the English forces included Greeks from Argos under the leadership of Thomas of Argos whose 'Courage, and prudence, and experience of wars' was lauded by the Corfiot traveller. Thomas was sent by Henry VIII to Boulogne in 1546, as commander of a battalion of 550 Greeks

During Henry VIII's reign more Greeks migrated to England from the island of Rhodes following the Knights Hospitaller, after the island was conquered by the Ottomans. A notable Rhodian was the merchant Franciscos Galiardis.

17th century
The descendants of the imperial Palaeologus dynasty carved out a niche as mercenary officers in Britain, and their tombs are still visible in locations as far apart – both geographically and in terms of social standing – as Westminster Abbey and Landulph parish church, Cornwall. A number of Palaeologi fought against each other as high-ranking officers for both sides in the English Civil War.

Early Modern Greco-Britons were not solely soldiers. A few individuals settled permanently, such as a native of Rhodes called Konstantinos Benetos, who was recorded as living in Clerkenwell between 1530 and 1578. These visitors, refugees and occasional long-term residents did not, as yet, constitute a community. They were too few, too obscure and too transitory, and above all they lacked the one thing that would have given them cohesion and a common identity: a church where they could practise their Orthodox faith.
Nikodemos Metaxas, a printer by trade, worked in London for a time in the 1620s. Some came as refugees, seeking asylum or financial help as a result of misfortunes suffered under Ottoman rule. One of them was Gregorios Argyropoulos, the owner of an estate near Thessaloniki. When a Turkish soldier was accidentally killed on Argyropoulos' land, the Ottoman authorities held him responsible and forced him to flee overseas and eventually to London in 1633. A charitable collection was made for him in London churches, and he was presented with £48 before he departed the following year.

By the late 17th century, matters had changed. A number of Greeks now occupied prominent positions in London life. Constantinos Rodocanachi of Chios had become one of the physicians to King Charles II (163 I -I 685) (PI. 1). Georgios Constantinos of Skopelos had established the Grecian coffeehouse in Devereux court, just off the Strand, and he could count Sir Isaac Newton and other members of the Royal Society among his clientele. Numbers had also increased. The expansion of Britain's overseas trade with the Levant brought many more merchant ships to the port of London, some of them crewed by Greeks. The time was therefore ripe to press for the establishment of a Greek Church.

In 1676 about one hundred families from the islands of Samos and Melos under the bishop Joseph Georgarinis migrated to England. Assisted by Konstantinos Rhodokanakis they were welcomed by the then Duke of York who later became King James II. They were granted settlements in Crown Str, Soho, later renamed to "Greek Str.".

The first documented organised Greek Orthodox community was established in London in the 1670s, with the first Greek Orthodox Church in London being erected in 1677, in Soho, on the corner of Charing Cross Road and Greek Street. The church was dedicated to the Dormition of the Virgin and was consecrated by the Metropolitan of Samos, Joseph Georgerinis. The founding inscription of the church (dated 1677), among others mentions that the church "was founded for the nation of the Greeks, in the reign of Most Serene King Jacob II".

Oxford also became home to a Greek community centred on what is now Worcester College, which was known as 'Greek College' for much of the 17th century. The Greek College was founded by Lord Paget, then ambassador to Constantinople, though recruitment of Greek students was halted in 1705 because " 'the irregular life of some priests and laymen of the Greek Church living in London has greatly disturbed the Greek Orthodox Church. Therefore the Church has also prevented those who wish to go and study at Oxford.'"

19th century to present
In the 19th century, two events drew Greeks towards Britain; commercial potential after the defeat of Napoleon, and the Diaspora, in which the Greek War of Independence saw a wave of emigres settle in Britain. Initially trading in shipping and commodities, most of these families were from Chios and Constantinople, and settled around Finsbury Circus in London, close to the commercial heart of the shipping industry; the Baltic Exchange and Lloyd's of London. Others settled in the commercial cities of Liverpool and Manchester, and later Glasgow and Cardiff. They were joined by other Greeks from the Aegean, Ionan, Smyrna, Athens and beyond. As they prospered these Greek merchants began to settle in London's Bayswater and established permanent institutions such as the Greek necropolis at Norwood in 1842, a Greek school and the Greek Orthodox church, later Cathedral of Aghia Sophia in 1877.

Britain gained control over Cyprus on 4 June 1878 as a result of the Cyprus Convention and formally annexed it in 1914. Greek Cypriots began to settle in London only from the 1930s. The earliest migrants came to the area around Soho, and many more arrived at the end of the Second World War. As rents in the West End increased, Camden and Fulham became popular areas for Greek-Cypriot migrants. Women initially worked from home in industries such as dressmaking. By the 1960s, a Greek language school and Greek Orthodox church, St Nicholas, had been established in Fulham.

Population 

It is estimated that the Greek population of London numbered several thousand by 1870, whereas in 1850 it had numbered just a few hundred.

The 2001 UK Census recorded 35,169 British residents born in Greece and 77,673 born in Cyprus, although the latter includes Turkish as well as Greek Cypriots. Recent estimates suggest that up to 300,000 ethnic Greeks may reside in the UK. The Office for National Statistics estimates that, as of  June 2021, the Greek-born population of the UK was 77,000.

Distribution
The 2001 Census recorded 12,360 Greek-born people living in London, with particular concentrations in the Hyde Park, Regent's Park, Chelsea and Kensington Census tracts. There are also large Greek communities in Sunderland, Moss Side in Manchester, Birmingham and Colchester. Generally, clusters of Cypriot-born people are found in the same locations as Turkish-born people, with 60 per cent living in areas of London with notable Turkish communities. The Census tracts with the highest number of Cypriot-born people in 2001 were Southgate, Palmers Green, Upper Edmonton, Cockfosters, Lower Edmonton, Tottenham North and Tottenham South. Many Greek-Cypriots reside in Wood Green, Harringay and Palmers Green, the latter harbouring the largest community of Greek-Cypriots outside Cyprus, resulting in these areas bearing local nicknames whereby the Green is replaced by Greek – as in Greek Lanes and Palmers Greek.

According to a City of London Corporation sponsored report, there are between 280,600 and 300,000 Greek speakers in Greater London.

Students
A considerable number of Greek students study in the UK. According to the official UK Higher Education Statistics Agency statistics, 16,050 Greek students attended UK universities in 2006/07, making Greece the fourth most common country of origin amongst overseas students in 2006/07, after China, India and the Republic of Ireland.

Education
There are two Greek international schools in London:
 Greek Primary School of London
 Greek Secondary School of London

Media
 London Greek Radio

Notable British Greeks

Theo James
Theodore of Tarsus (602–690), Archbishop of Canterbury
Princess Marina, Duchess of Kent
Prince Philip, Duke of Edinburgh 
George Logothetis, founding chairman and CEO of the Libra Group
Ben Agathangelou, engineer
Nick Bouras, professor of psychiatry 
Ion Calvocoressi, late British army officer 
Peter Calvocoressi, writer and army officer at Bletchley Park 
Rafika Chawishe, actress (Greek mother)
John Christoforou, late painter 
Damian Grammaticas, BBC journalist 
Sir Stelios Haji-Ioannou, entrepreneur 
Sir Alec Issigonis, late car designer 
Alex Kapranos, frontman of Franz Ferdinand
K Koke, rapper
George Michael, musician 
Marina, singer-songwriter
Yannis Philippakis, lead singer and guitarist of Foals
Panayiotis Kalorkoti, artist
Sophia Kokosalaki, fashion designer 
Sir Eddie Kulukundis, philanthropist
Nico Ladenis, chef 
Constantine Louloudis, rower 
Alexis Lykiard, writer 
Sir Basil Markesinis, University of Texas professor 
Tarki Micallef, former footballer 
Alexi Murdoch, musician 
John Negroponte, politician
 Theo Paphitis, entrepreneur
Henry Pyrgos, rugby union player
Angelique Rockas, actress and theatre practitioner, pioneer of multi-racial theatre in London
Vidal Sassoon, of Sephardic descent from Thessaloniki
Marina Sirtis, actress
Ian Vougioukas, international basketball player for Greece
Milo Yiannopoulos, journalist
Aris Roussinos, journalist
Pandeli Ralli, politician

See also
British Cypriots
Greece – United Kingdom relations

Notes

References

Further reading 

G.F. Bartle, 'The Greek boys at Borough Road during the War of Independence', Journal of Educational Administration and History 20 (1988), 1–11
P.A. Bezodis, 'The Greek church (later St. Mary's Crown Street) and St. Martin's Almshouses', in Survey of London, 44 vols. (London, 1900–94), xxxiii. 278-84
Robert Browning, 'Some early Greek visitors to England', in Essays in Memory of Basil Laourdas (Thessaloniki, 1975), pp. 387–95
Timotheos Catsiyannis, The Greek Community of London (London, 1993)
Timotheos Catsiyannis, Pandias Stephen Rallis, 1793–1865 (London, 1986)
Maria Christina Chatziioannou, 'Greek merchants in Victorian England', in Greek Diaspora and Migration since 1700, ed. Dimitris Tziovas (Aldershot, 2009), pp. 45–60
Chatziioannou Maria Christina (2010)  Mediterranean pahtways of Greek merchants to Victorian England, The Historical Review, Institute for Neohellenic Research, Vol. VII, pp. 213–237
Michael Constantinides, The Greek Orthodox Church in London (London, 1933)
P.M. Doll (ed.), Anglicanism and Orthodoxy 300 Years after the 'Greek College' in Oxford (Oxford and Bern, 2000)
T.E. Dowling and E.W. Fletcher, Hellenism in England (London, 1915)
Evangelia Georgitsoyanni, 'An unknown verse newspaper of the Greek diaspora', Analele Universitstii "Stefan Cel Mare" Suceava: Serie Filologie B. Literatura 11 (2005), 45–64
Jonathan Harris, 'The Grecian Coffee House and political debate in London, 1688–1714', The London Journal 25 (2000), 1–13
Jonathan Harris, Greek Emigres in the West, 1400–1520 (Camberley, 1995)
Jonathan Harris, 'Silent Minority: the Greek Community of 18th-century London', in Greek Diaspora and Migration since 1700, ed. Dimitris Tziovas (Aldershot, 2009), pp. 31–43
Jonathan Harris, 'Two Byzantine craftsmen in 15th century London', Journal of Medieval History 21 (1995), 387–403
Jonathan Harris and Heleni Porphyriou, 'The Greek diaspora: Italian port cities and London, c.1400–1700', in Cities and Cultural Transfer in Europe: 1400–1700, ed. Donatella Calabi and Stephen Turk Christensen (Cambridge, 2007), pp. 65–86
Alan Haynes, 'Greek nationals in England 1400–1705', History Today 29 (1979), 179–87
George Kakavas (ed.), Treasured Offerings. The Legacy of the Greek Orthodox Cathedral of St. Sophia, London (Athens, 2002)
Demetrius Mangreotis, 'The demographic history of the Greek mercantile community in London, 1837–1881', Historica 6 (1986), 349–68 (in Greek)

United Kindom
 
Greece–United Kingdom relations
Immigration to the United Kingdom by country of origin